In Greek mythology, the Telchines (Telkhines) were the original inhabitants of the island of Rhodes and were known in Crete and Cyprus.

Family
Their parents were either Pontus and Gaia or Tartarus and Nemesis or else they were born from the blood of castrated Uranus, along with the Erinyes. In another story, there were nine Telchines, children of Thalassa and Pontus; they had flippers instead of hands and the heads of dogs and were known as fish children. In some accounts, Poseidon was described as the Telchines' father.

Names
The following individual names are attested in various sources: Damon (Demonax); Mylas; Atabyrius; Antaeus (Actaeus), Megalesius, Ormenos (Hormenus), Lycus, Nicon and Mimon; Chryson, Argyron and Chalcon. Known female Telchines were Makelo, Dexithea (one of Damon's daughters), Halia and probably Lysagora (the attesting text is severely damaged).

Roles

Ministers of gods 
The Telchines were regarded as the cultivators of the soil and ministers of the gods and as such they came from Crete to Cyprus and from thence to Rhodes or they proceeded from Rhodes to Crete and Boeotia. Rhodes, and in it the three towns of Cameirus, Ialysos, and Lindos (whence the Telchines are called Ialysii), which was their principal seat and was named after them Telchinis (Sicyon also was called Telchinia) and by some accounts, their children were highly worshiped as gods in the said three ancient Rhodian towns. The Telchines abandoned their homes because they foresaw that the island would be inundated and thence they scattered in different directions; Lycus went to Lycia, where he built the temple of the Lycian Apollo. This god had been worshiped by them at Lindos (Apollôn Telchinios) and Hera at Ialysos and Cameiros (Hêra telchinia); and Athena at Teumessus in Boeotia bore the surname of Telchinia. Nymphs also are called after them Telchiniae.

Sorcerers and demons 
The Telchines were also regarded as wizards and envious daemons. Their very eyes and aspect were said to have been destructive. They had it in their power to bring on hail, rain, and snow, and to assume any form they pleased; they further produced a substance poisonous to living things. Thus, they were called Alastores for supervising the ceaseless wanderings of people and Palamnaioi for pouring the water of Styx with their palms and hands in order to make the fields infertile. The Telchines were described to have stings and being rough as the echinoid and thus, their names teliochinous that is “having a poisonous telos like an echinoid”.

Artists 
The Telchines were said to have invented useful arts and institutions which were useful to mankind and to have made images of the gods. Telchines were regarded as excellent metallurgists; various accounts state that they were skilled metal workers in brass and iron and made a trident for Poseidon and a sickle for Cronus, both ceremonial weapons. Together with their help and the Cyclopes, the smith god Hephaestus forged the cursed necklace of Harmonia. Because of their excellent workmanship, the Telchines were maligned by rival workmen and thus received their bad reputation.

This last feature in the character of the Telchines seems to have been the reason of their being put together with the Idaean Dactyls and Strabo even states that those of the nine Rhodian Telchines who accompanied Rhea to Crete brought up the infant Zeus and were called Curetes. The Telchines were associated and sometimes confused with the Cyclopes, Dactyls, and Curetes.

Mythology 
The Telchines were entrusted by Rhea with the upbringing of Poseidon, which they accomplished with the aid of Capheira, one of Oceanus' daughters. Another version says that Rhea accompanied them to Crete from Rhodes, where nine of the Telchines, known as the Curetes, were selected to bring up Zeus.

However, in other versions of the tale, Rhea, Apollo, and Zeus were described as hostile to the Telchines. The gods (Zeus, Poseidon or Apollo) eventually killed them because they began to use magic for malignant purposes; particularly, they produced a mixture of Stygian water and sulfur, which killed animals and plants (according to Nonnus, they did so as revenge for being driven out of Rhodes by the Heliadae). Accounts vary on how exactly they were destroyed: by flood or Zeus's thunderbolt or Poseidon's trident or else Apollo assumed the shape of a wolf to kill them. They apparently lost the Titanomachy, the battle between the gods and the Titans.

Ovid in his Ibis mentions that Makelo, like the other Telchines, was killed with a thunderbolt; according to Callimachus and Nonnus, however, Makelo was the only one to be spared. According to Bacchylides, the survivor is Dexithea. Bacchylides also mentions that Dexithea later had a son Euxanthios by Minos. This Euxanthios is also known from Pindar's works.

In rare accounts, the Telchines were originally the dogs of Actaeon, who were changed into men.

Genealogy

See also
Cabeiri

Notes

References 

 Diodorus Siculus, The Library of History translated by Charles Henry Oldfather. Twelve volumes. Loeb Classical Library. Cambridge, Massachusetts: Harvard University Press; London: William Heinemann, Ltd. 1989. Vol. 3. Books 4.59–8. Online version at Bill Thayer's Web Site
 Diodorus Siculus, Bibliotheca Historica. Vol 1-2. Immanel Bekker. Ludwig Dindorf. Friedrich Vogel. in aedibus B. G. Teubneri. Leipzig. 1888-1890. Greek text available at the Perseus Digital Library.
 John Tzetzes, Book of Histories, Book VII-VIII translated by Vasiliki Dogani from the original Greek of T. Kiessling's edition of 1826.  Online version at theio.com
John Tzetzes, Book of Histories, Book XII-XIII translated by Nikolaos Giallousis from the original Greek of T. Kiessling's edition of 1826.  Online version at theio.com
 Maurus Servius Honoratus, In Vergilii carmina comentarii. Servii Grammatici qui feruntur in Vergilii carmina commentarii; recensuerunt Georgius Thilo et Hermannus Hagen. Georgius Thilo. Leipzig. B. G. Teubner. 1881. Online version at the Perseus Digital Library.
 Nonnus of Panopolis, Dionysiaca translated by William Henry Denham Rouse (1863-1950), from the Loeb Classical Library, Cambridge, MA, Harvard University Press, 1940.  Online version at the Topos Text Project.
 Nonnus of Panopolis, Dionysiaca. 3 Vols. W.H.D. Rouse. Cambridge, MA., Harvard University Press; London, William Heinemann, Ltd. 1940-1942. Greek text available at the Perseus Digital Library.
 Pseudo-Apollodorus, The Library with an English Translation by Sir James George Frazer, F.B.A., F.R.S. in 2 Volumes, Cambridge, MA, Harvard University Press; London, William Heinemann Ltd. 1921. Online version at the Perseus Digital Library. Greek text available from the same website.
 Publius Ovidius Naso, Metamorphoses translated by Brookes More (1859-1942). Boston, Cornhill Publishing Co. 1922. Online version at the Perseus Digital Library.
 Publius Ovidius Naso, Metamorphoses. Hugo Magnus. Gotha (Germany). Friedr. Andr. Perthes. 1892. Latin text available at the Perseus Digital Library.
 Publius Papinius Statius, The Thebaid translated by John Henry Mozley. Loeb Classical Library Volumes. Cambridge, MA, Harvard University Press; London, William Heinemann Ltd. 1928. Online version at the Topos Text Project.
 Publius Papinius Statius, The Thebaid. Vol I-II. John Henry Mozley. London: William Heinemann; New York: G.P. Putnam's Sons. 1928. Latin text available at the Perseus Digital Library.
 Stephanus of Byzantium, Stephani Byzantii Ethnicorum quae supersunt, edited by August Meineike (1790-1870), published 1849. A few entries from this important ancient handbook of place names have been translated by Brady Kiesling. Online version at the Topos Text Project.
 Strabo, The Geography of Strabo. Edition by H.L. Jones. Cambridge, Mass.: Harvard University Press; London: William Heinemann, Ltd. 1924. Online version at the Perseus Digital Library.
 Strabo, Geographica edited by A. Meineke. Leipzig: Teubner. 1877. Greek text available at the Perseus Digital Library.

Ancient tribes in Rhodes
Greek mythological witches
Legendary tribes in Greco-Roman historiography
Rhodian characters in Greek mythology